For Horowitz is a 2006 South Korean drama film directed by Kwon Hyung-jin and starring Uhm Jung-hwa, Shin Eui-jae and Park Yong-woo.

Plot
Kim Ji-soo is a 30-year-old single woman who once dreamed about becoming a world-class pianist, but ends up opening a small neighborhood piano school on the outskirts of Seoul, where she teaches children to play.

She then meets Yoon Gyung-min, a 7-year-old orphaned boy who starts pestering her for no apparent reason. Gyung-min's parents died in a car accident, and he now lives with his uncaring grandmother. He is a troublemaker, emotionally distant from his peers, and possibly autistic.

When Ji-soo discovers that Gyung-min has untapped musical genius, she becomes determined to turn him into a renowned pianist like Vladimir Horowitz. She does this for her own selfish reasons, because if she gains the reputation of being a great piano teacher, that would lead to her school's success.

She uses music to communicate with her gifted student, ruthlessly giving him intensive piano lessons to prepare him for competitions. But their relationship turns maternal when Ji-soo realizes what the boy really needs is love.

Cast
 Uhm Jung-hwa as Kim Ji-soo
 Shin Eui-jae as Yoon Gyung-min
 Park Yong-woo as Shim Kwang-ho
 Choi Seon-ja as Gyung-min's grandmother
 Yoon Ye-ri as Jung-eun
 Jung In-gi as Ji-soo's older brother
 Yang Kkot-nim as Ji-soo's sister-in-law
 Park Young-seo as Pizza shop employee
 Ko Tae-ho as Bo-ram
 Lee Seung-hyun as Yoo-sik
 Kang Soo-jin as Ye-ri
 Choi Yoon-sun as So-young
 Kim Bo-ra as Min-hee
 Seo Ji-ah as Mi-ra
 Lee Oi-seon as Cleaner Lee
 Kim Jong-min as Taekwondo Kim
 Jo Seok-hyun as Video Park
 Julius Jeongwon Kim as Adult Gyung-min (cameo)

Box office
For Horowitz was released in South Korea on May 25, 2006. It drew 544,656 admissions during its theatrical run.

Awards and nominations

References

External links
 

2006 films
2000s musical drama films
South Korean musical drama films
2000s South Korean films
2000s Korean-language films